was a Japanese actress, voice actress, and writer of children's books.

Career
Kishida became an actress in 1950, and starred in a Yukio Mishima production of the 1960 film Salome. Her film and television drama credits number in the hundreds. Among them are four Taiga drama series on NHK television, with roles such as Aguri (the wife of Asano Naganori and Yodo-Dono (the wife of Toyotomi Hideyoshi). She appeared in various roles, including acting and narrating, in various Ōoku series on television. In the series Gokenin Zankurō, she portrayed the mother of the title character (played by Ken Watanabe), and narrated a Lone Wolf and Cub television series.

Kishida's film credits include Yasujirō Ozu's An Autumn Afternoon (1962), The Broken Commandment (based on a novel by Shimazaki Toson), Hiroshi Teshigahara's Woman in the Dunes (1964) and The Face of Another (1966) (both from novels by Kōbō Abe), Yasuzo Masumura's Manji (1964) (based on a novel by Jun'ichirō Tanizaki), Kon Ichikawa's The Tale of the Bamboo Cutter (1987) based on the classic story, Heaven and Earth (1990), and Spring Snow, the 2005 Isao Yukisada adaptation of the Mishima novel.

Kishida was the voice of Moomin in the 1960s television series. She provided narration for Vampire Princess Miyu and Princess Tutu as well as the 2005 Book of the Dead. In addition, she dubbed roles for Columbo and Miss Marple, and narrated Prophecies of Nostradamus. Kishida appeared in commercials for Nestle, TDK, and Asahi Shimbun.

Personal life
Kishida was born in Tokyo in 1930. Her father, Kunio Kishida, was a playwright. She was married to the actor Noboru Nakaya from 1954 until his death in 1978.

Kishida died on December 17, 2006 in Tokyo from respiratory failure caused by a brain tumor.

Filmography

Films
1950s

 Futeki na Otoko (1958), Sakie
 Akujo no Kisetsu (1958), Yoshimi Hayakawa
 Gurama-to no Yuwaku (1959), Sumiko Tsuboi
 Anyakōro (1959), prostitute

1960s

 Bokuto Kidan (1960), Teruko
 Nami no Tō (1960)
 Her Brother (1960), Mrs. Tanuma
 Minagoroshi no Uta yori Kenju-yo Saraba! (1960), Sally
 The Human Condition (1961), Ryuko
 Are ga Minato no Hi da (1961)
 Ten Dark Women (1961), Sayoko Goto
 Tokyo Yawa (1961), Ranko
 Ai to Honoho to (1961), geisha
 Onna wa Yogiri ni Nureteiru (1962), Yoshiko Hoshino
 Hakai (1962), Inoko's wife
 Namida o Shishi no Tategami ni (1962), Reiko Matsudaira
 An Autumn Afternoon (1962), 'Kaoru' no Madame
 Watashi wa Nisai (1962), Chiyo's Friend
 Shinobi no Mono (1962), Inone
 Bushido, Samurai Saga (1963), Lady Hagi
 Otoko Girai (1964), Utako Takamura
 Woman in the Dunes (1964), the woman
 Le mari était là (Otto ga Mita 'Onna no Kobako' yori) (1964), Yoko Saijyo
 Konnichiwa Akachan (1964), Ms Okiyama
 Kigeki Yōki-na Mibōjin (1964)
 Aku no Monsho (1964), Mitsue Takazawa
 Manji (1964), Sonoko Kakiuchi
 Nikutai no Gakko (1965), Taeko Asano
 Akuto (1965), Kanze
 Danryu (1966), Mikie Shima
 The Face of Another (1966), Infirmière
 Ō-oku Maruhi Monogatari (1967)
 Fushin no Toki (1968), Chizuko Mochizuki
 Senya Ichiya Monogatari (1969) (voice)
 Jotai (1969), Akie

1970s

 Senso to Ningen: Unmei no Jokyoku (1970)
 Moomin (1971), Moomin (voice)
 En to iu Onna (1971)
 Senso to Ningen II: Ai to Nanashimi no Sanga (1971), Kosanshi
 Tabi no Omosa (1972), Mama, the girl's mother
 Nosutoradamusu no Daiyogen (1974), Narrator
 Are wa Dare? (1976), voice
 Inugami-ke no Ichizoku (1976), Koto Teacher
 Utamaro: Yume to Shiriseba (1977), Ochika
 Nippon no Don: Yabohen (1977), Naoko Anekoji
 Sugata Sanshiro (1977), Omon
 Risu no Panashi (1978), voice
 Inubue (1978), narrator
 Jigoku (1979), Shima Ikegata

1980s

 Terra e... (1980), grandmother (voice)
 Rennyo to sono Haha (1981) (voice)
 Konoko no Nanatsu no Oiwai ni (1982), Mayumi
 Detective Story (1983), Kimie Hasenuma
 Seito Shokun! (1984), Michiko Hokujo
 Haru no Kane (1985), Fusako Ishimoto
 Rokumeikan (1986), Marchioness Takako
 The Sea and Poison (1986), Oba, Head Nurse
 Eiga Joyu (1987), Kuginukiya
 Seishun Kakeochi-hen (1987)
 Let's Gōtoku-ji! (1987), Miyabi Gōtokuji
 Hissatsu 4: Urami Harashimasu (1987), Benten - head of the assassins
 Yoshiwara Enjo (1987), Narrator
 Princess from the Moon (1987), Kougo
 Tsuru (1988), Kichibi
 Rikyu (1989), His wife end

1990s

 Ibara-hime matawa Nemuri hime (1990), voice
 Ten to Chi to (1991), Maid-In-Waiting
 Tenkawa Densetsu Satsujin Jiken (1991), Natsu Minakami
 Zodiac Killer (Ji dao zhui zong) (1991), Geisha Miyako
 Fusa (1993), Mura
 Gakkō no Kaidan 2 (1996), School Master
 Yatsuhaka-mura (1996), Kotake and Koume Tajimi
 Aisuru (1997), Taeko Kano

2000s

 Shinsengumi (2000), Komano (voice)
 Dora-heita (2000)
 Ningen no Kuzu (2001)
 Kuroe (2001), Cleaning Lady
 Sukedachi-ya Sukeroku (2001), Otome
 Sennen no koi - Hikaru Genji monogatari (2001), Gen no Naishi no Suke
 Winter Days (2003), Yasui (voice)
 The Book of the Dead (2005), narrator
 Haru no Yuki (2005), Kiyoaki's grandmother
 Onaji Tsuki o Miteiru (2005)
 Wool 100% (2006), Ume

Television drama

 Haru no Sakamichi (1971), Yodo-dono
 Akō Rōshi (1979), Riku
 A un (1980), Kimiko Kadokura
 Shin Jiken: Waga Uta wa Hana Ichimonme (1981), Shizuko Kosaka
 Rirakkusu: Matsubara Katsumi no Nichijō Seikatsu (1982), Mrs. Udagawa
 Mazakon-keiji no Kikenbo (1983)
 Takeda Shingen (1988), Jukei-ni
 Ōinaru Genei (1989), Katsuko Tojyo/Haru Yamafuji
 Yonimo Kimyō na Monogatari (1990) 
 Karin (1993) 
 Hacchōbori Torimono-banashi (1993) 
 Gokenin Zankurō (1995), Zankurō's mother
 Tokugawa Yoshinobu (1998), Matsushima
 Yakusoku (1999), Mom
 Jiko (2001), mother
 Teradake no Hanayome (2001)
 Purinsesu Chuchu (2002), narration
 Akachan o Sagase (2003)
 Dōbutsu no Oisha-san (2003), Taka Nishine
 Boku no Mahōtsukai (2003) 
 Yuga na Akuji 2: Kyōto Kadō Iemoto Renzoku Satsujin (2003) TV
 Onna no Naka no Futatsu no Kao (2004), Mrs. Takigawa
 Lone Wolf and Cub (2004), narrator
 Natsumeke no Shokutaku (2005), Kiyo

Television animation
 Moomin (1969), Moomin
 Moomin (1972), Moomin

Honours
Medal with Purple Ribbon (1994)

References

External links

1930 births
2006 deaths
Deaths from cancer in Japan
Deaths from brain tumor
Deaths from respiratory failure
Japanese film actresses
Japanese television actresses
Japanese voice actresses
Recipients of the Medal with Purple Ribbon
Voice actresses from Tokyo
Japanese writers
20th-century Japanese actresses
21st-century Japanese actresses